The Ghauri-III (Urdu:غورى–ااا; Hatf-VIII), was a codename of a program to developed land-based surface-to-surface intermediate range ballistic missile in a response to India's Agni-III missile.

Development began in KRL as primarily based on multistage liquid fuel system with a planned stage of range of over 3,000km (1,864.1mi). The program was scaled down in 2004 which eventually led to its full termination. Results of the program remains classified and no production is believed to have been undertaken. Pakistan also allegedly pursued another ballistic missile called Tipu missile having range 4000 km however no information was revealed. 2004 to 2019 KRL also developed Ghauri-4 and Ghauri-5 LRBM missiles.

Overview

The KRL pursued the development on liquid fuel rocket system, which resulted in development of Ghauri-I and Ghauri-II. The Ghauri program owes its existence largely to the efforts of Dr. Abdul Qadeer Khan who secured its funding from the Pakistan government. The Ghauri program was aggressively pursued along with the Shaheen program to reach as far as eastern region of India.

As like Shaheen program, Ghauri also shrouded in secrecy where information regarding the existence of the program relied heavily on the reports of news media. Very little details were made public, Ghauri was presumed to be road mobile, being transported and launched by a transporter erector launcher.  The warhead was believed to be HE/NE which was to be guided by an IGS system.

In May 2004, it was rumored that the missile system would take its first test flight in June of that year. However, no test occurred and speculations continued. Similarly in 2009, it was again reported that the missile system would be taking its first test flight in August of that year but again no test took place.

The program was eventually scaled down and it remains to be classified until the existence of the program was made public by dr. Abdul Qadeer Khan's memoir published on 28 May 2011. Development on Ghauri program was completed around 50% but the funding for the program was halted in 2004. Although Dr. Abdul Qadeer Khan held President Pervez Musharraf  responsible for capping the program, on the other hand, the Shaheen program continued to progress well.

In contrast to liquid-fuel systems that have less advantage in comparison to solid-fuel rockets. In 2015, the Shaheen-III was eventually revealed and successfully landed in Arabian sea.

See also
 Ballistic missile
 Liquid fuel rocket
Related developments
 Ghauri (missile)
 Ghauri-II
Related lists
 List of missiles of Pakistan

References

External links
 FAS.org news report - Ghauri-III engine trials completed
 MissileThreat.com article on Ghauri-3

Ballistic missiles of Pakistan
Post–Cold War weapons of Pakistan
Space launch vehicles of Pakistan
History of science and technology in Pakistan